RFA Argus is a ship of the Royal Fleet Auxiliary operated by the Ministry of Defence under the Blue Ensign. Italian-built, Argus was formerly the container ship  Contender Bezant. The ship was requisitioned in 1982 for service in the Falklands War and purchased outright in 1984 for a four-year conversion to an Aviation Training Ship, replacing RFA Engadine. In 1991, during the Gulf War, she was fitted with an extensive and fully functional hospital to assume the additional role of Primary Casualty Receiving Ship. In 2009, the PCRS role became the ship's primary function. Argus is due to remain in service beyond 2030. In July 2022 it was reported that the future Littoral Strike Role would be assumed by Argus after a refit to convert her to this role.

As the ship is armed and is not painted in the required white with red crosses, the Geneva Convention prevents her from being officially classified as a hospital ship. The ship's capabilities make her ideally suited to the humanitarian aid role and she has undertaken several of these missions. The Royal Navy has occasionally described her as a "support ship/helicopter carrier".

Design and facilities
The ship was built by Società Italiana Ernesto Breda at Marghera in Italy for Contender 2 Ltd (Sea Containers, Managers) of Hamilton, Bermuda, and was launched on 28 November 1980. In May 1982, the Contender Bezant was taken-up from trade by the Ministry of Defence (MoD) and given a basic conversion at HMNB Devonport to allow her to operate helicopters and Harrier jump jets in the transport role for Operation Corporate, the British military deployment to the Falkland Islands. She arrived in the area shortly after the Argentinian surrender and following a refit to her original configuration, was returned to her owners in November.

Following the conflict, the MoD investigated the replacement of the small helicopter support ship RFA Engadine, commissioning Vickers Shipbuilding and Engineering (VSEL) make a "concept study" resulting in the decision to convert a merchant ship to operate anti-submarine helicopters and with the ability to ferry Sea Harrier aircraft. In December 1983 the MoD invited British Shipbuilders of Birkenhead and Harland and Wolff in Belfast to tender on the building of a new Air Training Ship (ATS) or to purchase and convert an existing ship along the lines proposed by VSEL. By coincidence both tenders proposed converting the laid-up Contender Bezant and in March 1984, a fixed price contract was awarded to Harland and Wolff. Accordingly, she was purchased by the company for the estimated price of £18 million on 14 March 1984.
 
After a four-year conversion, the ship entered RFA service in 1988.  Having been initially designed as a container ship, she would have been too unstable when unloaded, making her motion at sea "very stiff" which resulted in a very short roll period which is not appropriate for operating helicopters. Therefore, her superstructure is deliberately heavily built (weighing some 800 tons), and she has 1,800 tons of concrete ballast carried in former hatch covers, which have been inverted to form tray-like structures.

Being a former container ship, Argus does not have a traditional aircraft carrier layout – the ship's superstructure is located forward, with a long flight deck aft. The ship has a small secondary superstructure approximately two-thirds of the way down the flight deck, containing the ship's exhaust funnel. This is used by small helicopters to simulate landing on the flight deck of a destroyer or frigate.

For the 1991 Gulf War Argus was fitted with a fully functional hospital, which has since been modified and extensively augmented with specialist equipment, providing 70 beds. The ship is equipped with an intensive-care unit, and can provide medical x-ray and CT-scan services. Casualties can be quickly transferred from the deck directly into the assessment area. Since 2009, the ship's role as a Primary Casualty Receiving Ship has been her primary role, although she continues to be used for aviation training.

In 2007 the ship was refitted with upgraded hospital facilities (replacing the forward aircraft lift with a ramp for emergency exit for hospital trollies and patients as well as two 50-man passenger lifts that lead to a new structure erected on the flight deck), generators and aviation systems (the ship is due to receive an upgrade to its night-vision capabilities enabling the use of WAH-64 Apache helicopters) to give an operational life until 2020.

Service history

1980s
As the MV Contender Bezant, following conversion the ship left Devonport on 20 May 1982 and calling at Charleston, South Carolina en route, arrived at Port William, Falkland Islands on 19 June 1982. She returned to the United Kingdom in August.

1990s
Argus entered service with the RFA in 1988, replacing  in the aviation training role. The ship deployed to the Persian Gulf in 1991 for service in the Gulf War (Operation Granby), and later provided humanitarian aid for Kurdish civilians in Operation Haven. Argus also saw service in the Adriatic in 1993 and 1999 supporting British operations in Bosnia and over Kosovo respectively. During this period, Argus operated in part as a LPH. On 2 February 1998, three helicopters based on Argus rescued 12 members of the crew of MV Delfin Mediteraneo from their life rafts when the ship sank in the Atlantic. Flying had been abandoned due to bad weather but the rescue went ahead in  waves, earning three Air Force Crosses and six Queen's Commendations for Bravery in the Air for the aircrew.

2000s
During times of war RFA Argus acts as a floating hospital with two fully equipped wards and mortuary.  The hospital was utilised in this way off the coast of Freetown in 2000–01, in support of British operations against the rebel West Side Boys.

A project to replace Argus called the Joint Casualty Treatment Ship (JCTS) was put on hold in December 2001 after passing initial approval.  The Integrated Project Team (IPT) managing the project was subsequently disbanded in 2005. Argus was most recently stationed at her home port of Falmouth in Cornwall, England, though being an RFA ship means that she also uses the former naval dockyard on Portland in Dorset, England.

In 2003 Argus was deployed again to the Gulf as a Primary Casualty Reception Ship during Operation Telic. A 33 ship fleet supported a British amphibious assault of the Al-Faw Peninsula.

In 2008 she deployed to the Middle East to act as a platform for Sea King ASaC7 helicopters. On 13 July, the ships of the deployment seized 23 tonnes of narcotics in the Persian Gulf

2010s
In June 2011, Argus was operating in the Middle East around Yemen. By August she had returned to Falmouth and was filmed for the film World War Z.

In mid-May 2012 the vessel, with embarked forces from the Royal Marines and Fleet Air Arm, including an embarked Super Lynx helicopter and the newly formed Humanitarian and Disaster Relief Team, set sail for North America to support potential humanitarian operations during the hurricane season. Their primary mission was to support the British Overseas Territories should they require assistance in the hurricane season as well as maintaining the constant Royal Navy presence within the wider region. Before commencing her disaster relief mission the ship engaged in multinational exercises and celebrations commemorating the War of 1812 with units from the US Navy as part of OpSail 2012.

In 2013 the ship was used for training with the AgustaWestland Wildcat, the successor to the Lynx.

In 2014 the ship participated in the annual Exercise Joint Warrior, practising Medical Evacuation and Treatment. On 8 October 2014, UK Foreign Secretary Philip Hammond announced that the RFA Argus would travel to Sierra Leone to assist with the 2014 Ebola outbreak. On 30 October of the same year, the vessel docked in Sierra Leone, with three Merlin helicopters embarked. Their work of establishing shore-based medical facilities and transporting aid to outlying areas earned the ship an Admiralty Board Letter of Commendation and 167 Ebola Medals for Service in West Africa were awarded to crew members.

In mid-2017 Argus was host to four Wildcat helicopters from 825 Naval Air Squadron for initial training off the coast of Portugal which lasted for three weeks.

In June 2018, following a year-long refit, she embarked Merlin HC4 helicopters of 845 Naval Air Squadron and Wildcats of 847 NAS which practised amphibious landings in support of exercise Baltic Protector in the Baltic Sea.

2020s
In April 2020, the Royal Navy dispatched the Argus to the Caribbean region to support British Overseas Territories, if required, during the COVID-19 pandemic, and in preparation for the upcoming hurricane season. This is contrary to some previous media reports in the tabloid press, which stated that she would be deployed to London to assist with the coronavirus outbreak in the UK.

Argus had been expected to retire from service in 2024. However, in 2022 the Defence Procurement Minister Jeremy Quin indicated that she was likely to be life extended until beyond 2030. Her functions are projected eventually to be taken over by the new Multi Role Support Ships proposed for acquisition in the 2021 defence white paper.

References

External links

 Royal Navy official website: RFA Argus

Training ships of the Royal Fleet Auxiliary
Gulf War ships of the United Kingdom
1981 ships